The Belarus men's national under-20 basketball team is a national basketball team of Belarus, administered by the Belarusian Basketball Federation. It represented the country in international men's under-20 basketball competitions.

After the 2022 Russian invasion of Ukraine, the FIBA suspended Belarus from participating in basketball and 3x3 basketball competitions.

FIBA U20 European Championship participations

See also
Belarus men's national basketball team
Belarus men's national under-18 basketball team
Belarus women's national under-20 basketball team

References

External links
Archived records of Belarus team participations

Basketball in Belarus
Basketball
Men's national under-20 basketball teams